The 1924 United States presidential election in South Carolina took place on November 4, 1924, as part of the 1924 United States presidential election which was held throughout all contemporary 48 states. Voters chose 9 representatives, or electors to the Electoral College, who voted for president and vice president. 

South Carolina voted for the Democratic nominee, Ambassador John W. Davis of West Virginia, over the Republican nominee, incumbent President Calvin Coolidge of Massachusetts. Davis ran with Governor Charles W. Bryan of Nebraska, while Coolidge ran with former Budget Director Charles G. Dawes of Illinois. Also in the running that year was the Progressive Party nominee, Senator Robert M. La Follette of Wisconsin and his running mate Senator Burton K. Wheeler of Montana.

Davis won South Carolina by a landslide margin of 96.56% of the vote.

Results

References

South Carolina
1924
1924 South Carolina elections